Sky HD may refer to:
Sky+ HD, a high-definition television service provided by British Sky Broadcasting Group in the United Kingdom and Ireland
Sky HD (Italy), a high-definition television service provided by Sky Italia in Italy
Sky HD (South Korea), a high-definition television service provided by Korea Broadcasting Corporation in South Korea